The Housing (Financial Provisions) Act 1924 (14 & 15 Geo. V c. 35) was an Act of Parliament in the United Kingdom.
The act increased government subsidies to be paid to local authorities to build municipal housing for rent for low paid workers from £6 to £9. It also extended the time over which the subsidy was paid from 20 to 40 years. Around 508,000 houses were built under this act.

The act was introduced by the first Labour government, and was known as the Wheatley Housing Act after John Wheatley, the minister who introduced it.

According to one historical study, Wheatley’s houses had “slightly larger dimensions than Chamberlain’s,” and were also the first to be “equipped compulsorily with a bathroom instead of a bath” in the scullery.

References

Modern Britain: Life and Work through Two Centuries of Change by T.K. Derry and T.L. Jarman

Further reading
Image of the Act on the Parliamentary website

United Kingdom Acts of Parliament 1924
Housing legislation in the United Kingdom